Teases & Dares is the fourth studio album by English pop singer Kim Wilde, released on 5 November 1984 by MCA Records. The song "Is It Over" featured in the film Fletch (1985).

Background
After leaving Rak Records, who had released her first three albums, Wilde signed to MCA Records in 1984. Her brother, Ricky Wilde, continued to serve as her producer, though was now assisted by their father, Marty Wilde, who also continued to co-write material. For the first time, Kim Wilde also received a co-producer credit and the album also marked the first time in which she earned a sole songwriting credit, for the tracks "Fit In" and "Shangri-La".

Three singles were taken from the album. "The Second Time" reached the UK Top 30 and the Top 10 in Germany, as well as becoming only her second single to reach the Billboard Hot 100 in the US, where it was retitled "Go for It" and peaked at No. 65. The second single from the album, "The Touch", was less successful but the third single, "Rage to Love" (remixed by Dave Edmunds), returned Wilde to the UK Top 20 for the first time in three years.

Image change
Prompted by her new record company, Wilde underwent a change of image for Teases & Dares and found herself being recast "in an entirely new light". She changed from a girl wearing secondhand clothes with self-dyed hair, to a Barbarella-inspired sci-fi heroine (by XL Design) for the cover of "The Second Time". Though this was initially only for the single, MCA Records decided to use the new image for the album cover also, which Wilde objected to. She later claimed that the album sleeve was one of the reasons for its weak sales, stating that it confused members of her audience who still regarded her as the "girl next door". For subsequent single releases from the album, Wilde switched back to an image she identified more with. For the "Rage to Love" promotion, she wore one of her father's Teddy Boy jackets, in keeping with the rockabilly retro theme of the song.

Critical reception
Billboard magazine praised Wilde for combining "techno-pop with a torch-styled edge" and described the sound as "somewhere between Sheena Easton and Debbie Harry". Rolling Stone described the "randy" lyrics for "The Second Time", written by Wilde's brother and father, as "somewhat perverse" and found her "too bland and docile a singer to generate much heat or to enliven Ricki's stale wall-of-synths production." However, the reviewer reserved praise for Kim's self-written efforts, writing that "Fit In" and "Shangri-La" "have the passive, yearning tone of a jailhouse diary" and expressed hope that the "vivacious, earnest singer might be smart enough to cut loose her puppet strings."

Track listing
All tracks written by Ricki Wilde and Marty Wilde, unless otherwise noted.

Side one
"The Touch" – 4:13
"Is It Over" – 3:56
"Suburbs of Moscow" – 3:24
"Fit In" (Kim Wilde) – 4:38
"Rage to Love" – 4:20

Side two
"The Second Time" – 3:54
"Bladerunner" – 4:29
"Janine" – 3:47
"Shangri-La" (Kim Wilde) – 4:49
"Thought It Was Goodbye" (Kim Wilde, Ricki Wilde, Marty Wilde) – 4:38

Bonus tracks (2010 remastered CD edition)
"Lovers on a Beach" ("The Second Time" B-side)
"Shangri-La" (Alternative Version)
"Putty in Your Hands" ("Rage to Love" B-side)
"Turn It On" (from the Weird Science soundtrack)
"The Second Time" (7" Version)
"The Touch" (7" Version)
"Rage to Love" (7" Version)

Bonus CD (2010 remastered CD edition)
"The Second Time" (12" Version)
"Lovers on a Beach" (12" Version)
"Go for It" (Extended Dance Version)
"The Touch" (12" Version)
"Shangri-La" (12" Version)
"Go for It" (Dub Version)
"Rage to Love" (12" Version)
"Shangri-La" (Special Re-Mix)
"The Second Time" (US Remix)

Personnel
All info taken from original LP.

 Kim Wilde – lead and backing vocals, Yamaha DX7 (4, 9), Solina String Synthesizer (4), Minimoog (9)
 Ricky Wilde – Synclavier II (1, 2, 3, 5–10), Roland Jupiter-8 (1, 2, 3, 5–10), Minimoog (1, 5, 6, 7), Solina String Synthesizer (1, 2, 5, 7, 9), guitars (1, 3, 8), backing vocals (2, 3, 5-8), Yamaha DX7 (3, 6, 7, 10), bass (8, 9), harmonica (10), computer programming 
 Steve Byrd – guitars (1, 4, 5, 8), backing vocals (1, 5, 8)
 Gary Twigg – bass (2, 3, 4, 10)
 Chris North – drums (1–5, 7, 8)
 Andy Duncan – percussion (10)

Production 
 Ricky Wilde – producer and arrangements (1, 2, 3, 5-8, 10)
 Marty Wilde – producer and  arrangements (1, 2, 3, 5-8, 10)
 Kim Wilde – producer and arrangements (4, 9)
 Nigel Mills – engineer
 John Shaw – photography
 XL Design – album design

Charts

Certifications

References

External links

1984 albums
Kim Wilde albums
MCA Records albums